The 2001–02 Tampa Bay Lightning season was the franchise's tenth season of operation in the National Hockey League (NHL). The Lightning failed to qualify for the playoffs for the sixth consecutive year.

Offseason

Regular season
On February 10, general manager Rick Dudley resigned and was replaced by assistant general manager Jay Feaster.

Final standings

Schedule and results

|- align="center" bgcolor="#FFBBBB"
|1||L||October 5, 2001||2–3 || align="left"|  New York Islanders (2001–02) ||0–1–0–0 || 
|- align="center" bgcolor="#FFBBBB"
|2||L||October 7, 2001||0–5 || align="left"|  Florida Panthers (2001–02) ||0–2–0–0 || 
|- align="center" bgcolor="#FFBBBB"
|3||L||October 11, 2001||3–4 || align="left"| @ San Jose Sharks (2001–02) ||0–3–0–0 || 
|- align="center" bgcolor="#CCFFCC" 
|4||W||October 13, 2001||1–0 || align="left"| @ Los Angeles Kings (2001–02) ||1–3–0–0 || 
|- align="center" bgcolor="#CCFFCC" 
|5||W||October 14, 2001||3–2 || align="left"| @ Mighty Ducks of Anaheim (2001–02) ||2–3–0–0 || 
|- align="center" bgcolor="#FFBBBB"
|6||L||October 16, 2001||1–2 || align="left"| @ Colorado Avalanche (2001–02) ||2–4–0–0 || 
|- align="center" bgcolor="#CCFFCC" 
|7||W||October 20, 2001||5–2 || align="left"|  New York Rangers (2001–02) ||3–4–0–0 || 
|- align="center" 
|8||T||October 23, 2001||1–1 OT|| align="left"|  Washington Capitals (2001–02) ||3–4–1–0 || 
|- align="center" bgcolor="#CCFFCC" 
|9||W||October 25, 2001||3–0 || align="left"|  Los Angeles Kings (2001–02) ||4–4–1–0 || 
|- align="center" bgcolor="#FFBBBB"
|10||L||October 27, 2001||3–4 || align="left"| @ Atlanta Thrashers (2001–02) ||4–5–1–0 || 
|- align="center" bgcolor="#FFBBBB"
|11||L||October 30, 2001||2–3 || align="left"| @ Toronto Maple Leafs (2001–02) ||4–6–1–0 || 
|-

|- align="center" bgcolor="#FFBBBB"
|12||L||November 2, 2001||1–4 || align="left"| @ Buffalo Sabres (2001–02) ||4–7–1–0 || 
|- align="center" bgcolor="#FF6F6F"
|13||OTL||November 3, 2001||1–2 OT|| align="left"| @ Pittsburgh Penguins (2001–02) ||4–7–1–1 || 
|- align="center" bgcolor="#FFBBBB"
|14||L||November 6, 2001||0–3 || align="left"| @ New York Islanders (2001–02) ||4–8–1–1 || 
|- align="center" bgcolor="#FFBBBB"
|15||L||November 8, 2001||1–2 || align="left"|  Philadelphia Flyers (2001–02) ||4–9–1–1 || 
|- align="center" bgcolor="#CCFFCC" 
|16||W||November 10, 2001||3–2 OT|| align="left"|  Pittsburgh Penguins (2001–02) ||5–9–1–1 || 
|- align="center" bgcolor="#FFBBBB"
|17||L||November 15, 2001||2–3 || align="left"|  Toronto Maple Leafs (2001–02) ||5–10–1–1 || 
|- align="center" bgcolor="#CCFFCC" 
|18||W||November 17, 2001||2–0 || align="left"|  Carolina Hurricanes (2001–02) ||6–10–1–1 || 
|- align="center" bgcolor="#CCFFCC" 
|19||W||November 20, 2001||3–2 || align="left"|  Mighty Ducks of Anaheim (2001–02) ||7–10–1–1 || 
|- align="center" bgcolor="#FFBBBB"
|20||L||November 21, 2001||2–3 || align="left"| @ Washington Capitals (2001–02) ||7–11–1–1 || 
|- align="center" bgcolor="#CCFFCC" 
|21||W||November 23, 2001||2–0 || align="left"|  New Jersey Devils (2001–02) ||8–11–1–1 || 
|- align="center" bgcolor="#CCFFCC" 
|22||W||November 25, 2001||4–0 || align="left"| @ Carolina Hurricanes (2001–02) ||9–11–1–1 || 
|- align="center" bgcolor="#FFBBBB"
|23||L||November 27, 2001||3–6 || align="left"| @ Boston Bruins (2001–02) ||9–12–1–1 || 
|- align="center" bgcolor="#CCFFCC" 
|24||W||November 29, 2001||5–2 || align="left"|  Atlanta Thrashers (2001–02) ||10–12–1–1 || 
|-

|- align="center" bgcolor="#FFBBBB"
|25||L||December 1, 2001||0–2 || align="left"| @ Philadelphia Flyers (2001–02) ||10–13–1–1 || 
|- align="center" bgcolor="#FFBBBB"
|26||L||December 2, 2001||0–1 || align="left"| @ New York Rangers (2001–02) ||10–14–1–1 || 
|- align="center" 
|27||T||December 4, 2001||1–1 OT|| align="left"| @ New Jersey Devils (2001–02) ||10–14–2–1 || 
|- align="center" bgcolor="#CCFFCC" 
|28||W||December 6, 2001||1–0 || align="left"|  Columbus Blue Jackets (2001–02) ||11–14–2–1 || 
|- align="center" bgcolor="#FFBBBB"
|29||L||December 8, 2001||2–5 || align="left"| @ Ottawa Senators (2001–02) ||11–15–2–1 || 
|- align="center" 
|30||T||December 10, 2001||1–1 OT|| align="left"| @ Vancouver Canucks (2001–02) ||11–15–3–1 || 
|- align="center" bgcolor="#CCFFCC" 
|31||W||December 12, 2001||3–1 || align="left"| @ Calgary Flames (2001–02) ||12–15–3–1 || 
|- align="center" bgcolor="#FFBBBB"
|32||L||December 14, 2001||1–2 || align="left"| @ Edmonton Oilers (2001–02) ||12–16–3–1 || 
|- align="center" bgcolor="#CCFFCC" 
|33||W||December 17, 2001||4–3 || align="left"| @ Montreal Canadiens (2001–02) ||13–16–3–1 || 
|- align="center" bgcolor="#CCFFCC" 
|34||W||December 21, 2001||4–3 OT|| align="left"|  St. Louis Blues (2001–02) ||14–16–3–1 || 
|- align="center" bgcolor="#CCFFCC" 
|35||W||December 26, 2001||1–0 || align="left"| @ Nashville Predators (2001–02) ||15–16–3–1 || 
|- align="center" bgcolor="#FFBBBB"
|36||L||December 27, 2001||2–3 || align="left"|  Carolina Hurricanes (2001–02) ||15–17–3–1 || 
|- align="center" bgcolor="#FF6F6F"
|37||OTL||December 29, 2001||4–5 OT|| align="left"|  Boston Bruins (2001–02) ||15–17–3–2 || 
|- align="center" bgcolor="#FFBBBB"
|38||L||December 31, 2001||1–4 || align="left"|  Toronto Maple Leafs (2001–02) ||15–18–3–2 || 
|-

|- align="center" bgcolor="#FFBBBB"
|39||L||January 2, 2002||0–2 || align="left"| @ Minnesota Wild (2001–02) ||15–19–3–2 || 
|- align="center" bgcolor="#FFBBBB"
|40||L||January 4, 2002||0–2 || align="left"| @ Chicago Blackhawks (2001–02) ||15–20–3–2 || 
|- align="center" bgcolor="#CCFFCC" 
|41||W||January 6, 2002||3–0 || align="left"| @ Phoenix Coyotes (2001–02) ||16–20–3–2 || 
|- align="center" bgcolor="#FFBBBB"
|42||L||January 8, 2002||1–2 || align="left"|  Dallas Stars (2001–02) ||16–21–3–2 || 
|- align="center" bgcolor="#FFBBBB"
|43||L||January 12, 2002||1–2 || align="left"|  Ottawa Senators (2001–02) ||16–22–3–2 || 
|- align="center" 
|44||T||January 13, 2002||2–2 OT|| align="left"| @ Atlanta Thrashers (2001–02) ||16–22–4–2 || 
|- align="center" bgcolor="#CCFFCC" 
|45||W||January 15, 2002||5–4 OT|| align="left"| @ New Jersey Devils (2001–02) ||17–22–4–2 || 
|- align="center" 
|46||T||January 18, 2002||2–2 OT|| align="left"|  Chicago Blackhawks (2001–02) ||17–22–5–2 || 
|- align="center" bgcolor="#FFBBBB"
|47||L||January 19, 2002||1–5 || align="left"|  Montreal Canadiens (2001–02) ||17–23–5–2 || 
|- align="center" bgcolor="#CCFFCC" 
|48||W||January 21, 2002||3–2 || align="left"|  New Jersey Devils (2001–02) ||18–23–5–2 || 
|- align="center" bgcolor="#FFBBBB"
|49||L||January 23, 2002||1–5 || align="left"| @ Pittsburgh Penguins (2001–02) ||18–24–5–2 || 
|- align="center" bgcolor="#FFBBBB"
|50||L||January 25, 2002||1–4 || align="left"| @ Buffalo Sabres (2001–02) ||18–25–5–2 || 
|- align="center" bgcolor="#FFBBBB"
|51||L||January 26, 2002||2–6 || align="left"| @ New York Islanders (2001–02) ||18–26–5–2 || 
|- align="center" bgcolor="#CCFFCC" 
|52||W||January 28, 2002||1–0 || align="left"| @ New York Rangers (2001–02) ||19–26–5–2 || 
|- align="center" bgcolor="#FFBBBB"
|53||L||January 30, 2002||1–3 || align="left"|  Carolina Hurricanes (2001–02) ||19–27–5–2 || 
|-

|- align="center" 
|54||T||February 4, 2002||4–4 OT|| align="left"|  Ottawa Senators (2001–02) ||19–27–6–2 || 
|- align="center" bgcolor="#CCFFCC" 
|55||W||February 6, 2002||3–2 || align="left"| @ Florida Panthers (2001–02) ||20–27–6–2 || 
|- align="center" bgcolor="#FFBBBB"
|56||L||February 7, 2002||1–3 || align="left"|  Florida Panthers (2001–02) ||20–28–6–2 || 
|- align="center" bgcolor="#FFBBBB"
|57||L||February 9, 2002||2–4 || align="left"|  Washington Capitals (2001–02) ||20–29–6–2 || 
|- align="center" bgcolor="#FFBBBB"
|58||L||February 11, 2002||1–3 || align="left"| @ Washington Capitals (2001–02) ||20–30–6–2 || 
|- align="center" bgcolor="#FF6F6F"
|59||OTL||February 26, 2002||3–4 OT|| align="left"|  Detroit Red Wings (2001–02) ||20–30–6–3 || 
|-

|- align="center" bgcolor="#CCFFCC" 
|60||W||March 1, 2002||4–2 || align="left"|  San Jose Sharks (2001–02) ||21–30–6–3 || 
|- align="center" bgcolor="#CCFFCC" 
|61||W||March 2, 2002||3–2 || align="left"|  Florida Panthers (2001–02) ||22–30–6–3 || 
|- align="center" bgcolor="#FFBBBB"
|62||L||March 6, 2002||2–3 || align="left"|  Edmonton Oilers (2001–02) ||22–31–6–3 || 
|- align="center" bgcolor="#FFBBBB"
|63||L||March 8, 2002||2–4 || align="left"|  Philadelphia Flyers (2001–02) ||22–32–6–3 || 
|- align="center" bgcolor="#CCFFCC" 
|64||W||March 10, 2002||5–1 || align="left"|  Nashville Predators (2001–02) ||23–32–6–3 || 
|- align="center" 
|65||T||March 12, 2002||4–4 OT|| align="left"| @ Atlanta Thrashers (2001–02) ||23–32–7–3 || 
|- align="center" bgcolor="#CCFFCC" 
|66||W||March 14, 2002||3–2 || align="left"|  Calgary Flames (2001–02) ||24–32–7–3 || 
|- align="center" 
|67||T||March 17, 2002||2–2 OT|| align="left"|  Buffalo Sabres (2001–02) ||24–32–8–3 || 
|- align="center" 
|68||T||March 18, 2002||3–3 OT|| align="left"| @ Philadelphia Flyers (2001–02) ||24–32–9–3 || 
|- align="center" bgcolor="#CCFFCC" 
|69||W||March 20, 2002||4–2 || align="left"|  Atlanta Thrashers (2001–02) ||25–32–9–3 || 
|- align="center" 
|70||T||March 22, 2002||3–3 OT|| align="left"|  Montreal Canadiens (2001–02) ||25–32–10–3 || 
|- align="center" bgcolor="#FF6F6F"
|71||OTL||March 24, 2002||3–4 OT|| align="left"|  Boston Bruins (2001–02) ||25–32–10–4 || 
|- align="center" bgcolor="#FFBBBB"
|72||L||March 26, 2002||2–7 || align="left"| @ Toronto Maple Leafs (2001–02) ||25–33–10–4 || 
|- align="center" bgcolor="#FFBBBB"
|73||L||March 28, 2002||1–2 || align="left"| @ Montreal Canadiens (2001–02) ||25–34–10–4 || 
|- align="center" bgcolor="#FFBBBB"
|74||L||March 30, 2002||1–3 || align="left"| @ Ottawa Senators (2001–02) ||25–35–10–4 || 
|-

|- align="center" bgcolor="#FFBBBB"
|75||L||April 1, 2002||4–6 || align="left"|  New York Rangers (2001–02) ||25–36–10–4 || 
|- align="center" bgcolor="#FFBBBB"
|76||L||April 3, 2002||1–4 || align="left"| @ Washington Capitals (2001–02) ||25–37–10–4 || 
|- align="center" bgcolor="#CCFFCC" 
|77||W||April 4, 2002||4–2 || align="left"|  Pittsburgh Penguins (2001–02) ||26–37–10–4 || 
|- align="center" bgcolor="#FFBBBB"
|78||L||April 7, 2002||3–5 || align="left"|  Buffalo Sabres (2001–02) ||26–38–10–4 || 
|- align="center" 
|79||T||April 9, 2002||2–2 OT|| align="left"| @ Boston Bruins (2001–02) ||26–38–11–4 || 
|- align="center" bgcolor="#FFBBBB"
|80||L||April 10, 2002||2–4 || align="left"| @ Carolina Hurricanes (2001–02) ||26–39–11–4 || 
|- align="center" bgcolor="#FFBBBB"
|81||L||April 12, 2002||1–3 || align="left"|  New York Islanders (2001–02) ||26–40–11–4 || 
|- align="center" bgcolor="#CCFFCC" 
|82||W||April 14, 2002||3–2 OT|| align="left"| @ Florida Panthers (2001–02) ||27–40–11–4 || 
|-

|-
| Legend:

Player statistics

Scoring
 Position abbreviations: C = Center; D = Defense; G = Goaltender; LW = Left Wing; RW = Right Wing
  = Joined team via a transaction (e.g., trade, waivers, signing) during the season. Stats reflect time with the Lightning only.
  = Left team via a transaction (e.g., trade, waivers, release) during the season. Stats reflect time with the Lightning only.

Goaltending
  = Left team via a transaction (e.g., trade, waivers, release) during the season. Stats reflect time with the Lightning only.

Awards and records

Transactions
The Lightning were involved in the following transactions from June 10, 2001, the day after the deciding game of the 2001 Stanley Cup Finals, through June 13, 2002, the day of the deciding game of the 2002 Stanley Cup Finals.

Trades

Players acquired

Players lost

Signings

Draft picks
Tampa Bay's draft picks at the 2001 NHL Entry Draft held at the National Car Rental Center in Sunrise, Florida.

See also
2001–02 NHL season

Notes

References

Tam
Tam
Tampa Bay Lightning seasons
Tamp
Tamp